The 2nd Space Launch Squadron is an active United States Space Force unit.  It is located at Vandenberg Space Force Base, California, and was reactivated in July 2019 with the merger of the 4th Space Launch Squadron and the 1st Air and Space Test Squadron.

History
When founded, the two launch squadrons at Vandenberg Air Force Base divided launch duties, with the 4th Space Launch Squadron working with Titan II and Titan IV vehicles while the 2nd worked with Delta II, Atlas, and other launch vehicles. On 18 May 1998, the two squadrons merged into the 2nd SLS.  The merged squadron was responsible for all launch operations at Vandenberg AFB.  The reason for the merger was the similarity in missions performed by both units. It was inactivated after the last Titan IV launch. In June 2019 the 4th Space Launch Squadron and the 1st Air and Space Test Squadron merged and reactivated as the 2nd Space Launch Squadron. The reestablished unit took on all the missions of both the 1st Air and Space Test Squadron and the 4th Space Launch Squadron. the 2nd Space Launch Squadron was one of only two space launch squadrons in the U.S. Air Force. the other being the 5th Space launch Squadron at Cape Canaveral.

Both space launch squadrons are now part of the U.S. Space Force.

Lineage
 Constituted as the 2d Space Launch Squadron on 11 September 1990
 Activated on 1 October 1990
 Inactivated on 31 October 2005
 Activated on 1 June 2019

Assignments
 Western Space and Missile Center, 1 October 1990
 30th Operations Group, 19 November 1991
 30th Launch Group, 1 December 2003 - 31 October 2005
 30th Operations Group, 1 June 2019

Stations
Vandenberg Air Force Base, California, 1 October 1990 – 31 October 2005; 1 June 2019 - present

Aircraft  and missiles
Atlas E
Atlas IIAS
Delta II
Titan IV
Titan II, 1 October 1990 – 2005

Decorations
Air Force Outstanding Unit Award
 1 November 1991 - 30 September 1993

List of commanders

 Lt Col Clinton Crosier, July 2001–July 2003
 Lt Col David D. Thompson, June 2002–July 2004
 Lt Col Brian Chatman, 25 June 2019
 Lt Col Ken Peters, July 2020-June 2022

References

Bibliography

External links
 Vandenberg Air Force Base

Squadrons of the United States Space Force